District 2 of Tehran Municipality(Persian:شهرداری منطقه ۲ تهران, also romanized as Mantaqe ye Dow), is one of 22 municipality districts of Tehran, which is located in Northeast of Azadi Sq. It stretches from West to Northwest and Azadi St. to South, to Ashrafi Esfahani Highway and Mohamamd Ali Jenah Expressway to West, and Chamran Highway to East.

At 2011 census, its population was 701,303 in 239,742 families.

References 

Smart Parking Meters Tehran’s District 2

Tehran County
Tehran-related lists